The Honda Reflex (TLR200) is a dual purpose trials motorcycle sold through 1986 to 1987.  Both year models are exactly the same. 1987 models were left over bikes from 1986, re-badged as 1987 models.

The Honda Reflex used an XR200 engine in a different frame.  This engine was also used in a three-wheeler made by Honda.

The Reflex also has the tight turning radii typical of trials motorcycles. Its steering column can almost turn completely perpendicular to the bike's frame. It's designed to be a stand up motorcycle, though it does have a seat and lights for road use. With light sprocket modifications it is a functional bike for motorcycle trials. 

Honda produced other trials models:
TL125
TL250
TL200E "Seeley"
TLR125
TLR250

Specification 

Dimensions

Overall Length:      2080mm
Seat height:         780mm
Dry weight:          90 kg 
Total weight:       100 kg

Engine 

Type:                Gasoline air cooled 4 stroke cycle  
Bore x Stroke:       65.5 x 57.8mm
Compression Ratio:   8.2:1 
Valve Train:         Over head cam Chain driven 
Maximum Horsepower:  13.4ps/6,500rpm 
Displacement:        194cc 

Drive Train

Clutch:              Wet Multi Plate 
Transmission         6 speed constant mesh 
  
Frame

Type:                 Diamond Frame 
Front suspension Travel:160mm
Rear suspension Travel:150mm

TLR200